Fabián Ariel Monserrat (born 25 June 1992 in Santa Fe, Argentina) is an Argentine professional footballer who plays as a midfielder for Talleres de Remedios de Escalada.

External links
 
 

Living people
1992 births
Argentine footballers
Association football midfielders
Club Atlético Independiente footballers
Crucero del Norte footballers
Venados F.C. players
Club Atlético Atlanta footballers
Guillermo Brown footballers
Talleres de Remedios de Escalada footballers
Ascenso MX players
Argentine expatriate footballers
Argentine expatriate sportspeople in Mexico
Expatriate footballers in Mexico
Footballers from Santa Fe, Argentina